This is a list of Indian states and territories by the percentage of households which are open defecation free, that is those that have access to sanitation facilities, in both urban and rural areas along with data from the Swachh Bharat Mission (under the Ministry of Drinking Water and Sanitation), National Family Health Survey, and the National Sample Survey (under the Ministry of Statistics and Programme Implementation). The reliability of this information can be questioned, as it has been observed that there is still open defecation in some states claimed "ODF".

The Swachh Bhara Missiont, a two-phase program managed by the Indian government, India has constructed around 100 million additional household toilets which would benefit 500 million people in India according to the statistics provided by Indian government (Phase 1: 2014–2019, Phase 2: 2020 to 2025). A campaign to build toilets in urban and rural areas achieved a significant reduction in open defecation between 2014 and 2019. In September 2019, the Bill & Melinda Gates Foundation awarded Indian leader Narendra Modi for his efforts in improving sanitation in the country. According to UNICEF The number of people without a toilet reduced from 550 million to 50 million. There have also been reports of people not using the toilets despite having one, although according to the world bank 96% of Indians used the toilets they had.  In October 2019, Modi declared India to be "open defecation free", though this announcement was met with skepticism by experts who cited slowly changing behaviors, maintenance issues, and water access issues as obstacles that continued to block India's goal of being 100% open defecation free.

Although open defecation still continues, it has been reduced by a large amount. With the success of the Swachh Bharat Mission, Modi has to launch Phase 2 from 2020 to 2025. During phase 2 the government will focus on segregation of waste and further eliminating open defecation in the country.

Open defecation has been an issue in India. A report published by WaterAid  stated that India had the highest number of people without access to basic sanitation despite efforts made by the Government of India under the Swachh Bharat Mission. About 522 million people practiced open defecation in India in 2014, despite having access to a toilet. Many factors contributed to this, ranging from poverty to government corruption.

Since then, through Swachh Bharat, a two-phase program managed by the Indian government, India has constructed around 100 million additional household toilets which would benefit 500 million people in India according to the statistics provided by Indian government (Phase 1: 2014–2019, Phase 2: 2020 to 2025). A campaign to build toilets in urban and rural areas achieved a significant reduction in open defecation between 2014 and 2019. In September 2019, the Bill & Melinda Gates Foundation awarded Indian leader Narendra Modi for his efforts in improving sanitation in the country. According to UNICEF The number of people without a toilet reduced from 550 million to 50 million. There have also been reports of people not using the toilets despite having one, although according to the world bank 96% of Indians used the toilets they had.  In October 2019, Modi declared India to be "open defecation free", though this announcement was met with skepticism by experts who cited slowly changing behaviors, maintenance issues, and water access issues as obstacles that continued to block India's goal of being 100% open defecation free.

Although open defecation still continues, it has been reduced by a large amount. With the success of the Swachh Bharat Mission, Modi has to launch Phase 2 from 2020 to 2025. During phase 2 the government will focus on segregation of waste and further eliminating open defecation in the country.

By 2016, three states/UTs namely Sikkim, Himachal Pradesh, Kerala had been declared ODF.

Household toilet construction increased from 43.79% in 2014, to 65.74% in 2016, to 98.53 in 2018. On 2 October 2019, all 35 states and union territories were declared defecation free.

List 

Notes

References

States and union territories of India-related lists
Lists of subdivisions of India
Social issues in India
Health in India by state or union territory
Water supply and sanitation in India